The Critics' Choice Movie Award for Best Foreign Language Film is one of the awards given to people working in the motion picture industry by the Broadcast Film Critics Association.

List of winners and nominees

1990s

2000s

2010s

2020s

Multiple winners 
Only 2 directors have won the award multiple times.

Notes
 § Nominated/won for different categories other than Foreign Language Film

References

F
Lists of films by award
Film awards for Best Foreign Language Film